Michael Jean Baptiste Messemer (March 30, 1851 - February 21, 1894) was an American physician. He served as the Coroner of New York County, New York. He was also active in politics as a member of the German Democrats and of Tammany Hall.

Early life
Messemer was born March 30, 1851 in New York City to Francis Messemer, a language interpreter and Gertrude Broschardt.  His parents were immigrants from the small Pfalz region town of Schallodenbach. At the age of seven Messemer along with siblings Edward and Anna were orphaned when their parents and sister Cecilia perished in the sinking of the Hamburg-American Steamer 'Austria'.   Messemer and his siblings were adopted by their paternal grandfather Peter Messemer, a former Mayor of Schallodenbach and president of the German Democratic party in New York.  Peter Messemer gained prominence as a leading real-estate holder in "kleindeutschland", the modern day East Village and landlord of several businesses including an early piano factory. The elder Messemer's early involvement in politics and the Tammany machine had a lasting effect on the younger Messemer. Messemer's grammar school education was within the Roman Catholic parochial school of the Church of the Most Holy Redeemer. He graduated from St. Francis Xavier's College at the age of sixteen after which he studied for two years at New York University School of Law, but left before completing his degree. Having given up the prospects of becoming an attorney, Messemer graduated from Bellevue Hospital Medical College in 1875 (now New York University School of Medicine).

Medical career
Messemer served for fifteen years as physician of internal and nervous diseases at Mount Sinai Hospital, for ten years as surgeon of the 5th regiment of the N.G.S.N.Y. He began is tenure as Deputy Coroner and Coroner in 1883 be elected to office as Deputy Coroner on the Tammany ticket. He would serve in the position of Coroner til his death receiving a salary of $10,000 a year with a three-month vacation period. Messemer was a popular and strong advocate of medical reform and was a member of a number of medical societies. He served on several publication boards of the Medico-Legal Society pushing for mortuary reform. Messemer was also a life member of the New York Pathological Society, the Neurological Society, the Medical Society of the State of New York .  He served from 1885 to 1886 as Health Commissioner of the city and was for nearly twenty years Medical Examiner in Lunacy of the State of New York and Medical Jurisprudence of New York County. Messemer was the consulting physician of the Germany Dispensary (later Lenox Hill Hospital, the New York Eye and Ear Infirmary, Leaks and Watts Children Home, Roman Catholic Orphan Asylum, Half Orphan Asylum for Destitute and Abandoned Children, The Thalia Theater and Tammany Hall  Messemer and his brother Dr. Edward Jean Messemer were active in medical educating regularly presiding over medical students residencies as well as teaching at medical schools in New York, Leeds, England, Paris and Montpellier, France, Marburg and Berlin, Germany. Messemer's most notable autopsy and inquest was of the 1885 death of railroad magnate William H. Vanderbilt, son and heir of the 'Commodore'.

Political career
M. J. B. Messemer's political ambitions began young with his father and grandfathers political prowess within the German community of New York and Tammany Hall. Messemer's intention for political power become evident upon the completion of his studies when he rand for Coroner. His association as one of the most senior members representing the German community and medical professionals began in 1875. He would attempt to run on at least four occasions for the position of Mayor of New York, but was always defeated in early ballots by the Irish opposition of Tammany. Messemer often acted as representative for the City of New York at State events in Washington and to visiting dignitaries, the most notable occasion being an evening cruise in honor of Prince Don Augusto in which anarchists attempted to bomb the vessel in an act of terror. He was known throughout his career for being particularly savvy when it came to political campaigning among the various ethnic groups of New York. It was known among many that he utilized his command of nearly every language in the city and cheery disposition to engage a more personal audience with voters. A number of political satires at the time mocked Messemer's name in relation to his ability to address any audience, some of these being; Michael J. B. Messemer and M. J. B. Messemer to the natives, M. Jean Baptiste Messemer to the French, Mike Messemer to the Irish, Michel Johann B. Messemer to the Germans, Maccaroni J. B. Messemer to the Italians, and the most satirical, Montgomery Jacqueminot Bleached Messemer.

Personal life and death
Messemer never married and devoted his life to his career and hobbies. Outside of his expansive medical practice he was an active member of the Liederkranz Society and Arion Society, the two largest German musical societies in the country at that time.  He was a member of the Press Club and frequently traveled to Washington where he participated in language competitions, a talent which he derived from his father who had been an interpreter. He traveled frequently collected specimen from around the world and also enjoyed a healthy social life following the pursuits of 19th century New York society. It was this life style which was blamed for his failing at the end of his life.

He resided at large townhouse at 144 Second Avenue with his brother for many years and later at 150 Second Avenue with his grandfather and two of his uncles. He spent the last six months of his life travelling through the Southwest and Europe. He died at Mentone, France on February 21, 1894. Following his death his will was contested by a German woman, Charlotte von Keuhnau who attempted to withdraw several thousands dollars from a Rothschild bank in Germany. Messemer's brother Edward had an injunction filed and later was awarded the entirety of the estate.

References

1851 births
1894 deaths
Physicians from New York City
New York University Grossman School of Medicine alumni
Coroners of New York County, New York